The Tough Guy is a 1926 American silent Western film directed by David Kirkland and starring Fred Thomson, Lola Todd, and Robert McKim.

Plot
As described in a film magazine review, Fred Saunders is a young ranch foreman who is in love with June Hardy, a school teacher. She is also courted by ranch owner Con Carney. The school teacher is in search of her lost brother Buddy who, unknown to her, is in an orphanage. Both men determine to recover her brother and thereby win her favor. One resorts to unscrupulous methods to gain his end and is defeated by the other, who wins the affections of the young woman.

Cast

References

Bibliography
 Donald W. McCaffrey and Christopher P. Jacobs. Guide to the Silent Years of American Cinema. Greenwood Publishing, 1999.

External links

 

1926 films
1926 Western (genre) films
American black-and-white films
Films directed by David Kirkland
Film Booking Offices of America films
Silent American Western (genre) films
1920s English-language films
1920s American films